The Hotel Arts is a 44-storey, 483 room luxury hotel on the seafront of Barcelona, in Catalonia, Spain. It is operated by Ritz-Carlton.

History 
Contrary to popular belief, it was not built to service the 1992 Summer Olympics, though its construction was part of the big changes undergone by the city to prepare the Games. The hotel opened as a 10-story building in 1992, then closed down to finish the construction project.

The construction was finished in 1994 and it is an example of high-tech architecture. It is 154 metres tall and was designed by Skidmore, Owings & Merrill with Colombian-Peruvian architect Bruce Graham as partner in charge. The design team was led by Senior Architect Miguel Ruano, with Dr Agustí Obiol as local Architect of Record.

In 2006, the hotel was acquired by the consortium composed of the Investment Fund of Singapour's Government (GIC), Host Hotels, and ABP. The consortium paid 417 million euros to acquire the hotel.

The hotel underwent a complete renovation in 2006, installing new technology and upgrading the rooms and bathrooms into modern, luxurious spaces. In 2009, the rooms of the 40th floor were replaced by meeting rooms.

In 2013, the Hotel Arts launched a digital guide for its guests. For the wedding of his niece in 2014, Lakshmi Mittal rented almost the whole building to house his guests. In 2014, the hotel recorded an average 80% occupancy.

In December 2015, Raúl Salcido became the new director of the hotel, replacing Rivero Delgado who was heading the hotel since 2010.

In June 2016, Ariana Grande rented the whole 36th floor when she passed by Barcelona.

Description 
Hotel Arts is set on the shore of the Mediterranean Sea, its pool is surrounded by gardens and offers guests the chance to sunbathe next to one of Barcelona's most famous pieces of contemporary public art—a monumental golden fish-like sculpture by Frank Gehry, which was created for the ’92 Games.

The hotel has 483 rooms, including 56 executive suites, 28 duplex penthouses, the royal penthouse and the presidential penthouse.

A spa is located on the 43rd floor of the building.

In March 2019, the restaurant Bites opened in the hotel. The restaurant Enoteca, also located in the hotel, is the only one in town with a 2-star Michelin rating. The hotel has a total of 6 restaurants.

The Hotel Arts is considered the second most expensive hotel in Spain.

See also 
 Torre Mapfre, tied with Hotel Arts for the title of tallest building in Barcelona
 Torre Glòries, third-tallest building in Barcelona

References

External links 

Hotel Arts Website
 Hotel Arts at Factoría Urbana: Photos and technical information about the building
 Architect Website

Hotel buildings completed in 1994
Sant Martí (district)
Skyscraper hotels in Barcelona
Hotels established in 1994
High-tech architecture
1994 establishments in Spain
Colombian inventions
Peruvian inventions